Iliovo is a village in the municipality of Delčevo, North Macedonia.

Demographics
According to the 2002 census, the village had a total of 127 inhabitants. Ethnic groups in the village include:

Macedonian(127 people)

References

Villages in Delčevo Municipality